Maulana Abdul Wasayis a Pakistani politician who has been a member of the National Assembly of Pakistan since August 2018.

Political career
In March 2013, he became leader of the Opposition in Provincial Assembly of Balochistan.

He was elected to the National Assembly of Pakistan from Constituency NA-257 (Killa Saifullah-cum-Zhob-cum-Sherani) as a candidate of Muttahida Majlis-e-Amal in 2018 Pakistani general election.

External Link

More Reading
 List of members of the 15th National Assembly of Pakistan
 No-confidence motion against Imran Khan

References

Living people
Pakistani MNAs 2018–2023
Leaders of the Opposition in the Provincial Assembly of Balochistan
Muttahida Majlis-e-Amal MNAs
Year of birth missing (living people)